The 1977 Iowa Hawkeyes football team represented the University of Iowa during the 1977 Big Ten Conference football season.

Schedule

Roster

Season summary

Northwestern

Source: Box score

Iowa State

Source: Box score

Arizona

at UCLA

Minnesota

Ohio State

at Michigan

at Wisconsin

Iowa’s 24–8 triumph in Madison started an 18–game unbeaten streak (17–0–1) against the Badgers.

Michigan State

Source: Game recap

Team players in the 1978 NFL Draft

References

Iowa
Iowa Hawkeyes football seasons
Iowa Hawkeyes football